The Norman Town Square is a public park at the center of Norman, Arkansas. It is bounded by 9th Street and Golf Course Road to the north and south, and Arkansas Highway 8 and Gurdon Avenue to the east and west. The town library, built in 1935 with funding from the Works Progress Administration, stands at the center of the park, and there are four diamond-shaped flower planting areas located near the corners of the park, built in 1937 with WPA funding. It is the only known Depression-era town square laid out and built in Montgomery County.

The park was listed on the National Register of Historic Places in 1993.

See also
National Register of Historic Places listings in Montgomery County, Arkansas

References

Parks on the National Register of Historic Places in Arkansas
Government buildings completed in 1935
National Register of Historic Places in Montgomery County, Arkansas
1935 establishments in Arkansas
Works Progress Administration in Arkansas
Squares in the United States
Library buildings completed in 1935
Libraries on the National Register of Historic Places in Arkansas
Bungalow architecture in Arkansas
American Craftsman architecture in Arkansas